Apogeshna infirmalis is a moth in the family Crambidae. It was described by Heinrich Benno Möschler in 1886. It is found in Jamaica and Puerto Rico.

References

Moths described in 1886
Spilomelinae
Moths of the Caribbean